Balladyna aka The Bait is a 2009 thriller,  produced and directed by Dariusz Zawiślak.

Literature

The film is based on one of the dramas from the Epoch of the Romanticism - Balladyna, written in Geneva in 1834 (and published for the first time in Paris in 1839) by poet and dramatist Juliusz Słowacki. Although the original drama was influenced by William Shakespeare's plays King Lear, A Midsummer Night's Dream and Macbeth, Balladyna is an original romantic work. The plot is set at the time of Poland's origins. There is King Popiel, deprived of power by a usurper; the noble prince Kirkor, aiming to restore King Popiel's rule; the queen of the Gopło Lake and the elves; and two beautiful sisters, one good, the other bad. Balladyna, greedy for power, gains it through a number of crimes, including the killing of her sister Alina, the contender to marry Kirkor. In the finale Balladyna dies, struck by divine justice.

Cast
 Faye Dunaway
Sonia Bohosiewicz 
Mirosław Baka
Rafał Cieszyński
Władysław Kowalski
Sławomir Orzechowski
Stefan Friedmann
Tadeusz Borowski
Magdalena Górska

References

External links
 

American thriller films
Polish thriller films
2009 thriller films
2000s English-language films
2000s American films
English-language Polish films